Marilyn Ryan (1933 - 2008) was a mayor and state legislator in California. She was a Republican and served three terms in the California Assembly.
She was the first mayor of Rancho Palos Verdes. She served as director of the California Arts Council.

Ryan died of congestive heart failure at the age of 75 at her home in Laguna Woods, California.

References

People from Rancho Palos Verdes, California
1933 births
2008 deaths
Women mayors of places in California
Women state legislators in California
Republican Party members of the California State Assembly
20th-century American women politicians
20th-century American politicians